Catharina Sabine Maria Laurine Elmsäter-Svärd (born 23 November 1965) is a Swedish politician who was Minister for Infrastructure from 2010 to 2014. A member of the Moderate Party, she was an MP of the Swedish Riksdag for Stockholm County from October to December 2014, having previously been that from 1997 to 2008. On 16 December 2014, she announced that she would leave politics.

She held the positions as Commissioner of Finance and Chief Commissioner in of Stockholm County Council from 2008 to 2010.  She also served as acting Minister of Defence from 29 March to 18 April 2012, following the sudden resignation of Sten Tolgfors.

References

External links 
Catharina Elmsäter-Svärd at the Riksdag website

1965 births
Female defence ministers
Swedish Ministers for Infrastructure
Living people
Members of the Riksdag from the Moderate Party
Women members of the Riksdag
Women government ministers of Sweden
Members of the Riksdag 2002–2006
21st-century Swedish women politicians